Wight is a surname. It is an older English spelling of either Wright (surname) or White (surname), or perhaps denoted an inhabitant of the Isle of Wight.

People
 Andrew Wight (1959–2012), Australian screenwriter and film producer
 Cameron Wight (born 1985), Australian rules footballer 
 David Wight (disambiguation), several people
 Dorothea Wight (1944–2013), English artist
 Dylan Wight, Australian politician
 Gail Wight, American new media artist
 James Wight, pen name James Herriot (1916–1995), British veterinarian and author
 Lyman Wight (1796 – 1858) Member of the Latter Day Saint
 Martin Wight (1913–1972), British scholar of International Relations
 Orlando Williams Wight (1824–1888), American author
 Paul Wight, ring name Big Show (b. 1972), American professional wrestler
 Peter Wight (b. 1950), English actor
 Robert Wight (1796–1872), Scottish surgeon and botanist
 Rohan Wight (born 1997), Australian cyclist
 Sean Wight (1964–2011), Australian rules football player
 Stephen Wight (born 1980), English actor 
 Thomas Wight (died ca. 1608), London publisher.